"Word to the Mutha!" is a song co-written and performed by American contemporary R&B group Bell Biv DeVoe and co-written and produced by Wolf & Epic (Richard Wolf and Bret "Epic" Mazur). It originally appeared on their debut studio album Poison under the title "Ronnie, Bobby, Ricky, Mike, Ralph and Johnny (Word to the Mutha)!", but the title was shortened and a remixed version of the song was issued as the only official single from the group's remix album WBBD-Bootcity!: The Remix Album. The song features vocals from Bobby Brown, Ralph Tresvant and Johnny Gill. It was the first recorded song to feature all six members of New Edition. Brown, Tresvant and Gill are credited separately on the single, rather than collectively as New Edition.

The song samples "A Star in the Ghetto" by Average White Band and "The Jam" by Graham Central Station.

A music video was filmed in and around the Orchard Park Housing Projects, in the Roxbury section of Boston, where five of the six (excluding Johnny Gill) New Edition members grew up.

Chart positions

References

External links
 
 

1990 songs
1991 singles
Bell Biv DeVoe songs
Bobby Brown songs
Johnny Gill songs
MCA Records singles
Ralph Tresvant songs
Song recordings produced by Epic Mazur
Song recordings produced by Richard Wolf
Songs written by Ricky Bell (singer)
Songs written by Michael Bivins
Songs written by Ronnie DeVoe
Songs written by Epic Mazur
Songs written by Richard Wolf